The 1984 Toohey's Brewery Australian Professional Championship was a professional non-ranking snooker tournament, which took place in August 1984.

Eddie Charlton won the tournament defeating Warren King 10–3 in the final.

Main draw

References

Australian Professional Championship
Australian Professional Championship
Australian Professional Championship
Australian Professional Championship